The following is a list of professional sports teams in North Carolina.

See also
 Sports in North Carolina
 List of sports venues in North Carolina

References

North Carolina

North Carolina sports-related lists